Ichoria chrostosomides is a moth of the subfamily Arctiinae. It was described by Schaus in 1905. It is found in French Guiana.

References

 Natural History Museum Lepidoptera generic names catalog

Arctiinae
Moths described in 1905